Dobrava is a settlement immediately north of the town of Ormož in northeastern Slovenia. The area belongs to the traditional region of Styria and is now included in the Drava Statistical Region.

See also 
 Dobrava (toponym)

References

External links
Dobrava on Geopedia

Populated places in the Municipality of Ormož